Dagon is a 2001 Spanish horror film directed by Stuart Gordon and written by Dennis Paoli. It is loosely based on H. P. Lovecraft's short story Dagon (1919) and his 1931 novella The Shadow Over Innsmouth. The film takes place in "Imboca", a Spanish adaptation of "Innsmouth". The film marked the last role of Francisco Rabal who died two months before its release.

Plot
Paul Marsh has a dream that he discovers a mermaid with razor-sharp teeth while scuba diving into a strange underwater cave. Paul awakes on a boat off the shores of Spain, where he is vacationing with his girlfriend, Barbara, and their friends Vicki and Howard. A sudden storm blows their boat against some hidden rocks. Vicki is trapped below deck and Howard stays with her while Paul and Barbara take a lifeboat to the nearby deserted fishing village of Imboca. During their absence, an unseen creature from the deep attacks the two in the boat.

On the shore, Barbara and Paul find no one about and venture into town until they eventually reach the church, where they find a priest. Barbara convinces him to help them, and the priest speaks with two fishermen at the docks, who volunteer to take either Paul or Barbara to the wreck. Despite Paul's misgivings, Barbara stays to try to find a phone in order to call the police and a doctor while Paul goes to help their friends.

Vicki and Howard are mysteriously missing, however, and Paul is taken back to Imboca, where he is sent to the hotel that Barbara was supposed to have gone to. However, she is missing as well and Paul is left to wait for her in an old, filthy hotel room, where he dreams of the mermaid again. His fitful rest is disturbed by a large gathering of strange, fish-like people approaching the hotel and he is forced to flee. He ends up in a macabre tannery full of human skins, where he discovers Howard's remains. He escapes the tannery by starting a fire and finds momentary safety with an old drunkard named Ezequiel, the last full-blooded human in Imboca.

Ezequiel explains to Paul that, many years ago, the village fell on lean times. A fishing ship captain named Orpheus Cambarro (based on captain Obed Marsh) convinced the locals to worship Dagon rather than God. Orpheus's first offerings to Dagon brought Imboca enormous wealth in the form of fish and gold. This caused the locals to make him the high priest of the Church of Dagon, help him dismantle the local Catholic church, and kill the priest to establish the church in Dagon's honor (based on Esoteric Order of Dagon). However, the wealth brought upon by Imboca from worshiping Dagon had a terrible price, as Dagon demanded blood sacrifices and human women to breed with. Corrupted by greed, the villagers and Cambarro blindly followed this demand. These were, respectively, the fates of Ezequiel's father and mother who resisted Opherus's heretical practice. Over time, the people of Imboca eventually began to die off, leaving only the half-fish/half-human offspring of Dagon and Dagon's offsprings themselves to settle in the village, who would kidnap unexpected trespassers to sacrifice to Dagon, while Ezequiel watched the village go to ruin and lamented the villagers' foolishness in worshiping a demon for short-lived prosperity.

Paul begs Ezequiel to help him escape. Ezequiel relents and takes Paul to the Mayor's manor, so he can steal the town's only car which belongs to Orpheus Cambarro's grandson Xavier Cambarro. Ezequiel distracts some Imbocans long enough for Paul to slip inside, but he accidentally honks the horn while trying to hot-wire the engine. Forced to flee into the manor, Paul finds a beautiful woman named Uxia, the mermaid from his dreams. She saves him from discovery, but when he finds that her legs have been mutated into tentacles, he flees in horror, despite her pleas for him to stay.

Paul narrowly escapes a horde of villagers in the car, but ends up crashing. He is caught and thrown into a barn, where he is reunited with Vicki, Ezequiel, and Barbara. The three plan to escape, but the attempt is foiled. Having been raped and impregnated by Dagon, the traumatized Vicki kills herself. Paul and Ezequiel are separated from Barbara and end up in a butchery, where they are chained and given a chance to join the worship of Dagon. When they both refuse, Paul apologizes to Ezequiel, who thanks Paul for helping him to remember his mother and father, who died resisting Dagon and the cult. He is flayed alive before Paul's eyes as they recite the 23rd Psalm together.

Paul is saved by the appearance of Uxia, who informs him that he has no choice but to join them. He offers to stay with her in return for Barbara's release, but she insists that Barbara must stay and bear Dagon's child. When Paul seems to concede, Uxia tells the priest of Dagon to make arrangements for their marriage. After Uxia leaves, Paul escapes, killing the guards and the priest. He starts looking for Barbara, collecting a can of kerosene on the way. When he reaches the church, apparently intending to burn it down, he instead discovers a hidden passage that leads below ground to a ritual chamber. There a congregation of Imbocans watch Uxia prepare Barbara to be offered to Dagon; she is chained by her wrists and lowered nude into a deep pit leading to the sea. While the Imbocan congregation and Uxia call to Dagon, Paul attacks, dousing several villagers in kerosene and setting them on fire. He winches Barbara back out of the pit, but Dagon has already raped her and she pleads with him to kill her. Paul refuses, and the monstrous Dagon himself grabs Barbara and tears her bodily (and bloodily) from the winch, claiming her as his new consort.

The uninjured Imbocans assault Paul, but are halted by Uxia and a monstrously deformed Imbocan who is revealed to be Xavier Cambarro Uxia and Paul's father. Uxia explains that Paul's human mother escaped from Imboca years ago after being impregnated by Xavier, but now that Paul has returned, he will be her lover and they will dwell with Dagon forever. Trapped and shocked that he has been an abomination all along, Paul pours the last of the kerosene over his own body and attempts to set himself on fire. Uxia grabs him and dives into the water, where Paul (horribly disfigured from the burns) sprouts gills. With no options left Paul embraces his fate and follows Uxia down into Dagon's undersea lair.

Cast

Production
The film is a Castelao Produccions, Estudios Picasso and Fantastic Factory production. Asked if it was difficult to convince Raquel Meroño that she was going to be shackled and dangled nude by force as part of her role, Stuart Gordon said, "She had never done a nude scene before. She's a big television star in Spain, so for her to do this was very brave, and also very physically demanding.

Release

Theatrical
Dagon was released theatrically in Spain on November 8, 2001; opening in 117 theaters, ranking #20 on the charts on its opening weekend where it grossed $101,273 averaging at $860. The film would later gross $43,773  bringing its total to $145,046, or €212,699 in Spanish currency.

Home media
Dagon was released on DVD by Lionsgate on July 23, 2002 and later that same year by Metrodome on October 7. The film was last released on DVD by Prism on February 2, 2004. On April 8, 2018, it was announced that the film would be released for the first time on Blu-ray, as a part of a collector's series by Vestron Video. This version was later released on July 24 that same year.

Reception

Marjorie Baumgarten from Austin Chronicle gave the film 3 out of 5 stars, calling it "horror so extreme that it borders on camp", further stating that it was "hampered by some clunky scripting [...] and middling performances." AllMovie gave the film a slightly positive review, writing, "Though it's not perfect, Lovecraft fans will most likely be willing to forgive Dagon's shortcomings in favor of a film that obviously shows great respect and appreciation for its source materials." 
KJ Doughton of Film Threat rated the film 3 out of 5 stars, writing, "While not a perfect movie, Dagon crams its wild, over-the-top concepts down our throats with so much conviction that we can't help but get swept along for the ride." Scott Tobias from The A.V. Club gave the film a mostly positive review, commending the film's first half, which he felt "came alive" through its suggestive gothic ambiance. and "well-placed jolts of violence". However, Tobias criticized the film's third act, which he felt downplayed the film's "distinctive flavor to ritualized nudity and gore". Ain't It Cool News gave the film a positive review, praising the film's atmosphere, tone, setting, and darker themes when compared to other adaptions of the author's works. HorrorNews.net criticized the film's low-budget special effects, and occasionally "hammy" acting. However, the reviewer concluded by stating, "Dagon comes across with a low budget, but it has a big heart and kind of a big bite to go with it." Nick Hartel from DVD Talk praised the film, calling it director Gordon's all-time best work, and the best Lovecraft adaption.
Reviewing the 2007 film Cthulhu, another adaptation of Lovecraft's story, Nick Pinkerton of LA Weekly stated that Dagon remained the better adaption of the story.

In their book Lurker in the Lobby: The Guide to the Cinema of H. P. Lovecraft, Andrew Migliore and John Strysik write that "Gordon nicely creates the decayed humanity of Lovecraft's Innsmouth" but also that the film's "relentlessness" is "draining and numbing." They conclude: "Dagon is a dark story well told, but for some Lovecraft lovers, it may be a fish that should have gotten away."

See also 
 List of Spanish films of 2001

References

External links
 
 
 
 Stuart Gordon Interview at Acidlogic.com

2001 films
2001 horror films
Cthulhu Mythos films
Films based on works by H. P. Lovecraft
Films directed by Stuart Gordon
Films set in Spain
Works based on The Shadow over Innsmouth
Spanish dark fantasy films
Spanish supernatural horror films
Films about cults
2000s monster movies
Spanish monster movies
2000s English-language films
English-language Spanish films
2000s Spanish films
Films set in Galicia (Spain)